This is a list of flag bearers who have represented Belgium at the Olympics.

Flag bearers carry the national flag of their country at the opening ceremony of the Olympic Games.

See also
Belgium at the Olympics

References

Belgium at the Olympics
Belgium
Olympic